Dichagyris spissilinea is a moth of the family Noctuidae. It is found in the region of southern Siberia and Mongolia.

External links
Die Trockenwälder der baumförmigen Juniperus-Arten
Fauna Europaea
Biodiversity of Altai-Sayan Ecoregion

spissilinea
Moths described in 1896